Wilen railway station, also known as Herisau Wilen, is a railway station in the municipality of Herisau, in the Swiss canton of Appenzell Ausserrhoden. It is located on the  Gossau–Wasserauen line of Appenzell Railways.

Services 
 the following services stop at Wilen:

References

External links 
 
 

Railway stations in the canton of Appenzell Ausserrhoden
Appenzell Railways stations